Jordan Kessler is an American film producer.

Filmography

Producer

Actor

References

External links

Living people
American film producers
Year of birth missing (living people)